Secret Places is a 1984 British drama film directed by Zelda Barron and starring Marie Theres Relin, Tara MacGowran, Claudine Auger and Jenny Agutter. It was based on a novel by Janice Elliott. It was one of the most popular films shown at the 1984 Toronto International Film Festival.

Plot 
The film, which takes place during the Second World War, tells the story of a German refugee girl sent to an English boarding school, where she bonds with an English girl.

Cast
 Marie Theres Relin as Laura Meister
 Tara MacGowran as Patience
 Claudine Auger as Sophie Meister
 Jenny Agutter as Miss Lowrie
 Cassie Stuart as Nina
 Ann-Marie Gwatkin as Rose
 Pippa Hinchley as Barbara
 Sylvia Coleridge as Miss Trott
 Klaus Barner as Dr. Meister
 Rosemary Martin as Mrs. MacKenzie
 Amanda Grinling as Miss Winterton
 Veronica Clifford as Miss Mallard
 Adam Richardson as Stephen
 Zoe Caryl as Junior
 Erika Spotswood as Valerie
 Bill Ward as Mr. Watts
 Rosamund Greenwood as Hannah
 Maurice O'Connell as Police sergeant
 Margaret Lacey as Mrs. Burgess
 Marissa Dunlop as Little girl
 Mike Heywood as Soldier in train
 Andrew Byatt as Soldier in train
 Tony London as Cockney soldier
 Georgia Slowe as Cordelia
 John Henson as Jack
 Robert Kelly as Gerald
 Paul Ambrose as David
 Francisco Morales as Carlo
 Stewart Guidotti as Alfredo
 Mark Lewis as Dino
 Jessica Walter as Girl #1 in art room
 Sian Dunlop as Girl #2 in art room
 Alan Berry as Dr. Parrish
 Lala Lloyd as Nurse
 John Segal as Al

References

External links

1984 films
1984 drama films
1984 LGBT-related films
Films scored by Michel Legrand
British drama films
Films directed by Zelda Barron
1980s English-language films
1980s British films